The Solomon Grove Smith–Hughes Building is a historic community building on Solomon Grove Road in Twin Groves, Arkansas.  It is a single-story stone structure, built out of locally quarried stone and covered by a gable-on-hip roof.  It was built in 1938 with funding support form the Works Progress Administration, and first served as a school.  It was built by the African-American mason Silas Owens Sr. on land he sold to the city in 1937.  It now houses a library.

The building was listed on the National Register of Historic Places in 1994.

See also
National Register of Historic Places listings in Faulkner County, Arkansas

References

Government buildings on the National Register of Historic Places in Arkansas
Buildings and structures completed in 1939
Buildings and structures in Faulkner County, Arkansas